Alfonsine Solar Park is a 36.2 MW solar photovoltaic (PV) plant in Northern Italy, near Alfonsine, Italy.

See also 

 List of photovoltaic power stations
 Montalto di Castro Photovoltaic Power Station
 Solar power in Italy

References 

Photovoltaic power stations in Italy